Rebecca Miller (born 1962) is an American  film director, screenwriter, author and actress.

Rebecca Miller may also refer to:

Rebecca Miller (singer), Canadian country music artist
Rebecca Miller (conductor), American conductor of classical music
Rebecca Miller (footballer), Australian rules footballer
Rebecca Miller (EastEnders), fictional character